Digby Neck is a Canadian peninsula extending into the Bay of Fundy in Digby County, Nova Scotia.

Digby Neck is the western extension of the North Mountain range from the Annapolis Valley and is made of two thick lava flows. It is separated from the eastern portion of the North Mountain by a deep, tidal channel, the Digby Gut. Along with Long Island and Brier Island, it forms the northwest shore of St. Mary's Bay.

The westernmost community on the Digby Neck is East Ferry, opposite Tiverton on Long Island to the west.  The "Petit Passage" separates Long Island from the Digby Neck.

Hurricane
In September 2008 Hurricane Kyle made landfall on the peninsula as a category 1 hurricane.

See also
Digby County, Nova Scotia
Volcanism of Canada
Volcanism of Eastern Canada

References

Peninsulas of Nova Scotia
Landforms of Digby County, Nova Scotia
Volcanism of Nova Scotia